Increpare Games Ltd is a British video game developer based in London, founded and operated by Stephen Lavelle. Lavelle uses the pseudonym "Increpare", the Latin word for "rebuke". Lavelle has released over 425 games since 2004, mostly small freeware games and often at the rate of several projects per month. With 178 games released between 2008 and 2014, Lavelle was named the "most prolific independent game developer" in the 2016 iteration of the Guinness World Records Gamer's Edition. Notable commercial releases include English Country Tune (2011) and Stephen's Sausage Roll (2016). In October 2013, Lavelle released PuzzleScript, an open-source scripting language for puzzle video games made in HTML5.

Selected works 
 MathCIV (2004, first freeware title listed)
 Opera Omnia (2009, freeware)
 English Country Tune (2011, commercial)
 Slave of God (2012, freeware)
 Cooking, for Lovers (2014, freeware)
 Stephen's Sausage Roll (2016, commercial)
 Quiet City (included in the August 2017 Humble Monthly as a "Humble Original")
 Hypnocult (2019, commercial)

References

External links 
 

2004 establishments in England
Video game companies of the United Kingdom